Belan is a hamlet,  southwest of Welshpool, in Powys, Wales. It belongs to the community of Welshpool. The Belan Locks, built around 1800 as part of the Montgomery Canal, are nearby.

See also
List of localities in Wales by population

References

Villages in Powys